Eastern Province cricket team was the former team that represented the Eastern Province in domestic first-class cricket in South Africa, alongside one-day matches. Eastern Province played first-class cricket from 1893–94 to 2004–05, when the team was merged with neighbouring team Border to form the entirely professional franchise the Warriors. 

From 2004–05 the former provincial teams, such as Eastern Province, were allocated two CSA Provincial Competitions that they could participate in: the CSA 3-Day Cup and the CSA One-Day Cup. Although given first-class status, these competitions were to be only semi-professional and no longer represented the top level of domestic cricket in South Africa.

In 2020, domestic cricket in South Africa was restructured and the six former franchise teams were dropped. In its place was a return to the more traditional two-division league format, with a total of fifteen professional teams competing, and the semi-professional provincial cricket being subsumed (effectively becoming Division 2) . These teams are more structured around a province when compared to the previous broad franchises. The Eastern Province name could have been resurrected during this time, however Eastern Province Cricket decided to maintain the brand recognition from the franchise era, with the new team continuing to be called the Warriors.

Squads
For the 2021-2022 season 
Matthew Breetkze
Wihan Lubbe
sinethemba Qeshile
jon-jon Smuts
Eddie Moore
Marco Jansen
Glenton Stuntman
Rudi Second 
Akhona Mnyaka
Lesiba Ngoepe
Diego Rosier
Tristan Stubbs
Dane Paterson
kabelo Sekhukhune
Mthiwekhaya Nabe
Tshepo Ndwandwe
Anrich Nortje (National contract)

Honours
 Currie Cup (2) – 1988–89, 1991–92; shared (1) – 1989–90
 (Benson & Hedges) Standard Bank Cup (2) – 1989–90, 1991–92
 South African Airways Provincial Three-Day Challenge (0) – 
 South African Airways Provincial One-Day Challenge (0) – 
 Gillette/Nissan Cup (4) – 1971–72, 1975–76, 1986–87, 1989–90

Venues
Venues have included:
 St George's Park (a.k.a. Axess DSl oval), Port Elizabeth (1889–present)
 Union Ground, St George's Park, Port Elizabeth (occasional venue 1952–1986)
 Rhodes University Great Field, Grahamstown (two games 1973–1978)
 Kemsley Park, Port Elizabeth (occasional venue Jan 1980 – Dec 1996)
 Rhodes University Prospect Field, Grahamstown (occasional venue Dec 1980 – Sept 1993)
 Uitenhage Cricket Club A Ground, Uitenhage (Dec 1981 – Feb 1989)
 Nelson Mandela Metropolitan University No 1 Oval, Port Elizabeth (occasional venue Dec 1982 – Feb 1999)
 Standard Cricket Club Ground, Cradock (two matches 1985–1991)

See also
 List of Eastern Province representative cricketers

References

Sources
 South African Cricket Annual – various editions
 Wisden Cricketers' Almanack – various editions

External links
 Eastern Province at CricketArchive

South African first-class cricket teams
Cricket in the Eastern Cape